Always Be My Maybe may refer to:

Always Be My Maybe (2016 film), 2016 Philippine romantic-comedy film
Always Be My Maybe (2019 film), 2019 American romantic-comedy film

See also
"Always Be My Baby", song